The Ultimate Song Chart Awards Presentation 2022 was held at AsiaWorld–Expo, Arena on 1 January 2023.

Winners

Performances

References

External links
Ultimate Song Chart Awards Presentation 2022 Videos

2022 in Hong Kong
2022 music awards